Eupithecia pseudosatyrata is a moth in the family Geometridae. It is found on the Kamchatka Peninsula.

References

Moths described in 1929
pseudosatyrata
Moths of Asia